Jean-Louis Masurel (born c. 1940) is a French businessman in the banking, hospitality, and luxury food and wine industries. He was the chief executive officer (CEO) of Moët-Hennessy and LVMH, and is now the CEO of Société des bains de mer de Monaco.

Early life
Jean-Louis Masurel was born circa 1940. He graduated from the University of Lille in 1957, HEC Paris in 1962, and the Harvard Business School in 1964.

Career
Masurel worked for Morgan Guaranty Trust, now part of J.P. Morgan & Co., from 1964 to 1979. He then worked for BNP Paribas from 1980 to 1983. served as the Chief Executive Officer of Moët-Hennessy and LVMH. He serves as the Chief Executive Officer of the Société des bains de mer de Monaco. Additionally, he serves as Vice Chairman of the Supervisory Board of Oudart. He also serves on the board of directors of the Compagnie de Transports Financière et Immobilière, Banque J. Safra - Monaco, and Banque du Gothard.

Masurel is the owner of Arcos Investissement, a holding company. He was the owner of Hédiard, a luxury food brand, from 1991 to 1995. He acquired Château Trians, a vineyard in Néoules in Southern France, in 1989. He also serves as a Managing Partner of the Société des Vins de Fontfroide.

References

Living people
HEC Paris alumni
Harvard Business School alumni
French winemakers
French bankers
Year of birth missing (living people)